A  is an altar used in Shinto-style ancestor worship, dedicated in the memory of deceased forebears.  It generally has a mirror symbolizing the spirits of the deceased or a tablet bearing their names and is used not only to enshrine blood relatives, but also to honor respected non-family members.

Since Buddhist funeral rites dominate in Japanese religious practice, tamaya are found less often in Japanese houses than their Buddhist counterpart, the butsudan. Their value are also below that of the more highly respected kamidana.

Ritual
The tamaya is placed in an inner chamber, on a shelf, the mitama-san-no-tana, attached to the wall about six feet high.  It is placed lower than the kamidana.

Rites are performed for the tamaya every tenth day up to the fiftieth, and thereafter on the one-hundredth day and one-year anniversary.  The one-year ritual is followed by another which marks the spirit's joining of the ancestors at the family shrine.

History
The first tamaya was built in 1599 in the Toyokuni Shrine in Kyoto for Toyotomi Hideyoshi.  Screen paintings and its ruins suggest that it was modeled after the Kitano Tenman-gū.  It was later destroyed by the Tokugawa.

Later the tamaya was generally established for Japanese nobles, military heroes, and other people with high reputation. This practice spread in the Edo period.  During the Kokugaku movement it became more common to erect tamaya in ordinary homes. It formed a central part of the Shinto funeral rituals (神葬祭, shinsōsai).

References

 
Shinto shrines in Japan
Japanese architectural features
Shinto religious objects
Veneration of the dead